Sam Leuii (born 4 June 1969) is a retired professional boxer from New Zealand. In his career he has held the IBF Pan Pacific Title and has fought for the Commonwealth title. Leuii is also a two time New Zealand professional National Champion and a five time New Zealand Amateur National Champion.

Professional boxing titles
New Zealand Boxing Association 
New Zealand National super middleweight title (167¼ lbs)
International Boxing Federation 
Pan Pacific super middleweight title (167¼ lbs)
Oceanic Boxing Association 
OBA super middleweight title (167 lbs)
New Zealand National Boxing Federation  
New Zealand National cruiserweight title (167 lbs)

Professional boxing record

References

1969 births
Living people
Boxers from Auckland
New Zealand male boxers
Heavyweight boxers
New Zealand professional boxing champions